Canadian Weightlifting Federation-Haltérophilie Canadienne (CWFHC)  is the governing body for the sport of weightlifting in Canada.

History
The origins of Canadian olympic weightlifting started from the beginning of the 20th century. Canada produced a large number of World Championships and Olympic athletes since the 1924 Summer Olympic Games.

References

External links
 

Canada
Federation
Weightlifting
Sports organizations established in 1909